Suleiman Wanjau Bilali (born June 5, 1978) is a Kenyan light flyweight boxer. He has represented Kenya numerous times at international competitions.

Bilali fought at the 2000 Summer Olympics, where he was edged out by Spain's eventual runner-up Rafael Lozano 10:11 in the quarterfinal.

At the 2002 Commonwealth Games in Manchester he lost by technical knockout to India's Muhammed Ali Qamar. He won the 2003 All-Africa Games.

Bilali participated in neither the 2004 Summer Olympics nor in the Commonwealth Games 2006.

He was again victorious in the 2007 All African Games vs. Simanga Shiba and Manyo Plange and qualified for the Olympics but lost his match 3:9 to Dominican Winston Méndez Montero. He lost his first bout during the Beijing Olympics in 2008.

He has since moved to professional boxing

References
 sports-reference

1978 births
Living people
Light-flyweight boxers
Boxers at the 2000 Summer Olympics
Boxers at the 2002 Commonwealth Games
Boxers at the 2008 Summer Olympics
Olympic boxers of Kenya
Commonwealth Games competitors for Kenya
Sportspeople from Nairobi
Kenyan male boxers
African Games gold medalists for Kenya
African Games medalists in boxing
Competitors at the 2003 All-Africa Games
Competitors at the 2007 All-Africa Games